The following is a timeline of the history of the city of Wichita Falls, Texas, USA.

19th century

 1879 - Barwise family settles in area.
 1880 - Population: 433.
 1881 - First United Methodist Church built.
 1882 - Fort Worth and Denver City railroad begins operating.
 1883 - First Baptist Church founded.
 1886 - Drought begins.
 1887 - Wichita Weekly Times newspaper begins publication.
 1889
 Town of Wichita Falls incorporated.
 Otis T. Bacon becomes mayor.
 1890 - Population: 1,978.
 1896 - "Lynching of two bank robbers."
 1900
 Ladies Library Association organized.
 Lake Wichita created near town.

20th century

 1909 - Electric streetcar begins operating.
 1910
 U.S. military Call Field (airfield) begins operating near town.
 Union Station built.
 Gem Theatre (cinema) in business.
 Population: 8,200.
 1911 - Electra oil field begins operating in vicinity of town.
 1912 - Ball Brothers Glass Manufacturing Company plant in business.
 1913 - Palace Theatre in business.
 1917 - Drought begins.
 1918
 Kemp Public Library opens.
 Burkburnett oil field discovered near Wichita Falls; oil boom begins.
 1920
 Burnett Street Bridge and Temple Israel synagogue built.
 Population: 40,079.
 1922
 Wichita Falls Junior College established.
 Women's "Manuscript Club" organized.
 1924 - Lake Kemp and Lake Diversion created in vicinity of town.
 1927 - Scott Avenue Bridge and Municipal Auditorium built.
 1928 - "Airline passenger service" begins.
 1930 - May 11: Dust storm.
 1932 - Town/county 50th anniversary observed.
 1933 - Wichita Gardens Homestead Colony for urban poor created (approximate date).
 1937
 Scott Avenue Overpass built.
 Parking meters introduced.
 1938
 KWFT radio begins broadcasting.
 Wichita Falls Day Nursery built.
 Kamay oil discovered near Wichita Falls.
 1941 - U.S. military Sheppard Field begins operating.
 1947 - Lake Kickapoo created in vicinity of Wichita Falls.
 1948 - U.S. military Sheppard Air Force Base active.
 1950
 Midwestern University active.
 Population: 68,042.
 1952 - Grant Drive-In cinema in business.
 1953 - KAUZ-TV and KFDX-TV (television) begin broadcasting.
 1960 - Population: 101,724.
 1963 - Wichita Falls Ballet Theatre founded.
 1964
 April 3: Tornado.
 Gates Rubber Company plant in business.
 1966
 Wichita Falls joins the Nortex Regional Planning Commission.
 Lake Arrowhead created in vicinity of Wichita Falls.
 1969 - Wilson Memorial Parkway dedicated.
 1970
 School's Memorial Stadium opens.
 Board of Commerce and Industry active.
 1978 - Wichita Falls Transit System begins operating.
 1979 - April 10: 1979 Red River Valley tornado outbreak.
 1982 - Wichita Falls Area Food Bank established.
 1986 - Artificial waterfall built at Lucy Park.
 1987 - Times Record News in publication.
 1995 - Mac Thornberry becomes U.S. representative for Texas's 13th congressional district.
 1999 - City website online (approximate date).

21st century

 2010
 Glenn Barham becomes mayor.
 Population: 104,553.
 Racially-motivated shooting spree kills one and injures four others, before the suspect committed suicide.

See also
 Wichita Falls history
 List of mayors of Wichita Falls, Texas
 National Register of Historic Places listings in Wichita County, Texas
 Timelines of other cities in the North Texas area of Texas: Arlington, Dallas, Denton, Fort Worth, Garland, Irving, Plano

References

Bibliography

 
 
 
  circa 1926? 
 Jonnie R. Morgan, The History of Wichita Falls (Wichita Falls, 1931)

External links

 
 
 Items related to Wichita Falls, Texas, various dates (via Digital Public Library of America)
 
 Wichita County Historical Commission

Wichita Falls
Wichita Falls, Texas